Robert James Franklin (5 October 1886 – 20 September 1959) was an Australian rules footballer who played with South Melbourne in the Victorian Football League (VFL).

Notes

External links 

1886 births
1959 deaths
Australian rules footballers from Victoria (Australia)
Sydney Swans players